Pourouma cecropiifolia (Amazon grape, Amazon tree-grape or uvilla; syn. P. multifida) is a species of Pourouma, native to tropical South America, in the western Amazon Basin in northern Bolivia, western Brazil, southeastern Colombia, eastern Ecuador, eastern Peru, and southern Venezuela.

It is a medium-sized evergreen tree growing to 20 m tall. The leaves are palmately compound, with 9–11 leaflets 10–20 cm long and 2.5–4 cm broad, on a 20 cm petiole. The flowers are white, produced 20 or more together in a 10 cm long inflorescence; it is dioecious, with male and female flowers on separate trees. The fruit is ovoid, 1–2 cm long, purple when ripe, grape-like except for its wintergreen smell; the skin is rough, inedible but easily peeled.

Agriculture
The fruit is sweet and juicy, eaten fresh and made into jams. The tree grows quickly, and grows well in poor upland soils. It is vulnerable to floods. The fruit is susceptible to fungal attacks and does not keep well, which limits its commercial viability.

References

External links

Pourouma cecropiaefolia (Purdue University)

cecropiifolia
Trees of Brazil
Trees of Colombia
Trees of Peru
Flora of the Amazon
Tropical agriculture